Luca Bassanese (born 18 December 1975, Vicenza, Italy) is an Italian singer, songwriter, actor, writer, and musician who is very practicing in social issues.
He won the MEI Plate 2015 (Independent Labels Meeting) as best folk music artist, the Recanati Musicultura Award and the Certificate of merit for the Civil Commitment (National Award "Marcello Torre"). Bassanese is one of the most important exponents of the new Italian folk music. His lyrics are both poetic and satiric and denounce the contradictions of his country through an unconventional (original) language.

Career

Three stages signed the way that Luca Bassanese will decide to begin in his artistic path: the assiduous listening of Fabrizio De André Volume III album, the daily contact with his father harmonica player, and the meeting with the composer, author and producer Stefano Florio with whom he begins an artistic and human fellowship that will take him to collaborate in the realization of his albums and his performances.
Being an artist in tune with environmental and civil commitment movements, he has been disclosed to the general public in 2004, when he won the XV Recanati Musicultura Award edition with the piece (song) Confini.
After several concerts from the beginning of his artistic career in Italy, he collaborated with National and International artists and musicians such as Antonio Cornacchione, Jacopo Fo and the Original Kocani Orkestar of Macedonia. Luca Bassanese flies to France to promote his sixth album, "Popolare Contemporaneo", on 23 November 2013. He gets (achieved) a massive success of public and criticism with a concert at the prestigious Cabaret Sauvage in Paris within Le Bal Rital happening.

On 11 December 2013, Bassanese was awarded with the Certificate of merit for the Civil Commitment (National Award Marcello Torre).

In 2014 his album entitled "L'amore (è) sostenibile" argues about the sustenibility issue, and the song in the album entitled "La balata dell'emigrante" is dedicated to Italian migrants.

On 17 October 2014 he opens the Grand Soufflet Festival in Bretagne (France), followed by a new band created for the European tour called Tarantella Circus Oschestra.

On 4 October 2015 Luca Bassanese receives the "MEI (Independent Labels Meeting) Plate as the best artist for the safeguarding of Italian folk music with particular reference to the environmental, cultural and social sustainability issues".

Awards and nominations
 2004 – Recanati/Musicultura Award, XV Edition, for the song "Confini”
 2013 – Vrban Eco-festival Award "for the continuous research and civil commitment through his music and writing on social and environmental sustainability issues"
 2013 – Certificate of merit for the Civil Commitment (National Award "Marcello Torre")
 2015 – Best original soundtrack Award "Icilio Sadun" dedicated to Roberta Bartali
 2015 – MEI (Independent Labels Meeting) Plate as the best artist for the safeguard of Italian folk music with particular reference to the environmental, cultural, and social sustainability issues

Discography

Albums

Videography 
 A Silva – directed by Stefano Florio
 Maria – directed by Riccardo Papa
 Guernica – directed by Stefano Florio
 Santo Subito! – directed by Stefano Florio
 Canzone d'amore (contro la violenza sulle donne) – directed by Stefano Florio
 La leggenda del pesce Petrolio – directed by Stefano Florio, Marco Donazzan, Lorenzo Milan
 La Canzone del laureato – directed by Stefano Florio
 Qui si fa l'Italia o si muore – directed by Michele Piazza
 Signora speranza – directed by Michele Piazza
 Fuck Austerity! (prima che questo tempo ammazzi l'allegria) – directed by Michele Piazza
 Ho visto un re – directed by Michele Piazza
 La ballata dell'emigrante – directed by Francesco Mastronardo
 La Classe Operaia (Non va più in paradiso) – directed by Francesco Mastronardo
 Ola ola ola (tu sei Superman, tu hai venduto Peter Pan) – directed by Francesco Mastronardo

Theatrical performances
 L'Italia Dimenticata – with songs of Domenico Modugno dirigé par Stefano Florio
 Un Nuovo Mondo è Possibile – with Domenico Finiguerra, dirigé par Stefano Florio
 "A Silva… la storia, la vita e l'arte di tramandarla attraverso la musica" – produced and directed by Stefano Florio

Bibliography

Novels by Luca Bassanese 
 Soltanto per amore, poesie, lettere e momenti di vita, Buenaonda (2009)
 Racconti di un visionario, Buenaonda (2010)
 Oggi ho imparato a volare, Buenaonda (2012)

References

External links
 

1975 births
Living people
Italian  male singer-songwriters
Italian folk singers
21st-century Italian  male singers